Microzarkodina is an extinct genus of conodonts mainly from the Middle Ordovician of Baltoscandia. The Microzarkodina apparatus probably consisted of 15 or 17 elements: four P, two or four M and nine S elements. The S elements include different Sa, Sb1, Sb2, and Sc element types.

Use in stratigraphy 
The base of the Darriwilian, the fourth stage of the Ordovician, lies just above the North Atlantic Microzarkodina parva conodont zone.

References

External links 
 
 

Ordovician conodonts
Ozarkodinida genera